The Maison Molinard was founded in 1849 in Grasse, Provence, in the south of France, a historic centre of Europe's perfume industry. It has remained an entirely family-run business to this day, and is also one of the oldest of its kind in France after Galimard established in 1747 (though not run by original founding family). At that time, Molinard produced floral waters and Eau de Cologne, which was sold in its "little shop" in the Grasse town centre. In 1860 the firm began creating new single floral fragrances from Jasmin, Rose, Mimosa and Violet in discreet, elegant bottles made of Baccarat crystal.
 
In 1900, the company moved into an old perfume factory, where the distillery structure was designed by Gustave Eiffel and perfumery is still based there today.
Molinard's first customers were wealthy foreigners from England and Russia that came to the French riviera and also bought Molinard's eau de Cologne and other floral fragrances.

In 1920, the famous bottle-designer Julien Viard (1883-1938) created a number of outstanding glass flacon designs for company perfumes. 1921 the firm launched one of the first solid perfume, Concréta, a fragranced natural flower wax used directly as a perfume.

During 1920's and 1930's Art-Deco interwar period the company also hired renowned glassmaker René Lalique of Lalique to design and produce a number of magnificent bottles for Molinard that are sought after collector's classic today.

References 

http://www.molinard.com/en/histoire.html
http://www.grasse.fr/spip.php?rubrique395
http://www.grasse.fr/spip.php?page=espace_pro_presta&id_rubrique=486&id_article=773
http://travel.nytimes.com/travel/guides/europe/france/provence-and-the-french-riviera/grasse/25975/parfumerie-molinard/attraction-detail.html
http://edition.cnn.com/2012/08/09/travel/savoring-south-of-france/index.html

Cosmetics companies of France
Perfume houses
Manufacturing companies established in 1849
1849 establishments in France
Grasse